José Marco Berges (born Pedrola, Spain, 10 January 1950) is a Spanish politician who belongs to the Spanish Socialist Workers' Party (PSOE) and who previously served as President of the Government of Aragon, one of the Spanish regional administrations, from 1993 to 1995.

In 1995, Marco supported Ángela Abós Ballarín as his successor, and he made a speech in support of her to the Cortes of Aragon. However, Ballarín was ultimately defeated by Santiago Lanzuela.

References

1950 births
Living people
Presidents of the Government of Aragon
Spanish Socialist Workers' Party politicians
Members of the Cortes of Aragon